The 40th Virginia Infantry Regiment was an infantry regiment raised in Virginia for service in the Confederate States Army during the American Civil War. It fought mostly with the Army of Northern Virginia.  Prior to the reorganization of the army after Chancellorsville, it was part of the first brigade of A.P. Hill's Light Division. Field officers were Colonel John M. Brockenbrough; Lieutenant Colonels Fleet W. Cox, Arthur S. Cunningham, and Henry H. Walker; and Majors Edward T. Stakes and William T. Taliaferro.

Background
The 40th Virginia completed its organization in May 1861. Its members were recruited in Northumberland, Richmond, and Lancaster counties. After serving in the Aquia District, the unit was assigned to General Field's, Heth's, and H.H. Walker's Brigade, Army of Northern Virginia. It participated in the campaigns of the army from the Seven Days' Battles to Cold Harbor, then was involved in the Petersburg siege north of the James River and the Appomattox Campaign.

Battles
It sustained 180 casualties during the Seven Days' Battles which was about half its effective force. The unit lost 4 wounded at Cedar Mountain, had 14 killed and 73 wounded at Chancellorsville, and of the 253 engaged at Gettysburg more than twenty percent were disabled. Many were captured at Sayler's Creek and only 7 men were included in the surrender on April 9, 1865.

A captain in Company I, while in a Union prison, recorded an additional stanza to the popular Confederate soldier song, Goober Peas.

See also

List of Virginia Civil War units

References

Units and formations of the Confederate States Army from Virginia
1861 establishments in Virginia
Military units and formations established in 1861
1865 disestablishments in Virginia
Military units and formations disestablished in 1865